The Yamaha XT1200Z Super Ténéré is a motorcycle produced by Yamaha Motor Corporation, that was launched in 2010.
The XT1200Z is the largest in a series of dual-sport Yamaha motorcycles named after the Ténéré, a desert region in the south central Sahara. It features a liquid-cooled four-stroke, fuel-injected  parallel-twin engine with a 270° crank, which powers the motorcycle through a six-speed gearbox and shaft drive. The XT1200Z also features multi-mode traction control system and electronic throttle control (YCC-T) with programs to support off-road use, switchable engine mapping, and combined brakes with ABS.

The launch models were badged First Edition and came with bash plates and aluminum panniers.

See also
BMW R1200GS
Moto Guzzi Stelvio
KTM 1290 Super Adventure
Honda Africa Twin

References

External links
Official microsite

Bluetenere a blog dedicated to the XT1200Z Super Tenere

XT1200Z Super Tenere
Dual-sport motorcycles
Motorcycles introduced in 2010
Motorcycles powered by straight-twin engines
Shaft drive motorcycles